John M. James served as a member of the 1867-1869 California State Assembly, representing California's 1st State Assembly district.

References

California state senators
19th-century American politicians
Year of birth missing
Year of death missing